Scopula nivearia is a moth of the  family Geometridae. It is found in Japan and the Russian Far East.

References

Moths described in 1897
nivearia
Moths of Japan
Moths of Asia